The 1965–66 season was the 82nd football season in which Dumbarton competed at a Scottish national level, entering the Scottish Football League, the Scottish Cup and the Scottish League Cup.  In addition Dumbarton competed in the Stirlingshire Cup.

Scottish Second Division

An uncharacteristically successful start to the league season, with only one defeat in the first ten games, saw Dumbarton at the top of the league at the end of October, and even with a winless 'blip' in November, another string of five wins on the trot followed, meaning that hopes were still high in February for that illusive promotion place.  However, only 3 wins were taken from the final 16 games, and Dumbarton finished in a disappointing 12th place, with 35 points, 18 behind champions Ayr United.

Scottish League Cup

In the League Cup, Dumbarton maintained a 100% record at home in their sectional ties, but the three away defeats ensured no further progress to the knock out stages.

Scottish Cup

In the Scottish Cup, Dumbarton required to fight through two preliminary rounds, before disposing of Montrose and then Queen of the South.  Aberdeen however were too tough a 'nut to crack' in the third round.

Stirlingshire Cup
Locally, Dumbarton were unlucky in their attempt to retain the Stirlingshire Cup.  A first round replay win over Division 1 opponents Falkirk was followed by a draw in the semi final against Alloa Athletic.  However the tie was decided by the toss of a coin - which Dumbarton lost.

Friendlies

Player statistics

Squad 

|}

Source:

Transfers
Amongst those players joining and leaving the club were the following

Players in

Players out 

Source:

References

Dumbarton F.C. seasons
Scottish football clubs 1965–66 season